Emmanuel Arceneaux (born September 17, 1987) is an American professional wide receiver for the Edmonton Elks of the Canadian Football League (CFL). He played college football at Alcorn State University.

Arceneaux signed as an undrafted free agent with the BC Lions of the CFL in 2009. He has also been a member of the Minnesota Vikings, Washington Redskins, New York Jets, Saskatchewan Roughriders, and Frisco Fighters.

College career
Arceneaux played college football for the Alcorn State Braves. While at Alcorn State, he maintained a 3.0 GPA and was president of the student-athlete advisory committee, while recording 99 career catches for 1,618 and 12 TDs on the football field. He is a member of Alpha Phi Alpha fraternity.

Professional career

BC Lions
Arceneaux was signed to the BC Lions, on May 19, 2009 and made the Lions' active roster after training camp. Arceneaux had an outstanding debut season, starting at the wide receiver position for all 18 games and recording 63 catches for 858 yards and seven touchdowns. He caught a touchdown pass in each of his first three games and had two 100-yard receiving games during the season. He led all receivers in the 2009 playoffs, recording 12 catches for 189 yards. He continued his strong play in 2010 by registering his first 1000-yard season while finishing second on the team in receiving yards and touchdowns.

Minnesota Vikings
On January 22, 2011, Arceneaux agreed to the terms on a three-year contract with the Minnesota Vikings. During the 2011 season, he played in three regular season games, catching one pass for 10 yards. On August 31, 2012, as the Vikings reduced their roster down to league maximum of 53 players, he was released.

Washington Redskins
On September 1, 2012, the Washington Redskins claimed Arceneaux off waivers and signed him to the practice squad.

New York Jets
Arceneaux was signed by the New York Jets to a reserve/future contract on January 2, 2013. He was waived on May 7, 2013.

BC Lions (II)
On May 16, 2013, Arceneaux's agent announced that Emmanuel Arceneaux would be returning to CFL within a week. The BC Lions, Toronto Argonauts and Edmonton Eskimos were all believed to have interest in the free-agent. On May 21, 2013, it was officially announced that Arceneaux had signed with the Lions, with whom he had played two seasons with before going south to the NFL. The contract was reportedly a two-year, $280,000 deal. Arceneaux was fined an undisclosed amount by the CFL following a Week 4 touchdown celebration involving props. Arceneaux used the end-zone corner post and the football to mimic putting in golf. Arceneaux gained an increasingly prominent role in the Lions offense over the next three seasons, culminating in being named a CFL All-Star in 2015 after setting (then) career highs in receptions, yards and touchdowns. Following the 2015 CFL season Arceneaux was re-signed by the Lions through the 2017 CFL season. 

Arceneaux continued his stellar play in 2016 and 2017, catching at least 100 receptions in both seasons. On December 12, 2017 the Lions announced they had re-signed Arceneaux to a one-year deal through the 2018 season. Arceneaux suffered a torn ACL halfway through the season, at the time of the injury he was the Lions leading receiver in catches and yards.

Saskatchewan Roughriders
Arceneaux was signed to a one-year contract by the Saskatchewan Roughriders on February 15, 2019. He played in 11 games and recorded 22 receptions for 249 yards and two touchdowns. He also played in the Roughriders' West Final loss where he had one catch for five yards. He became a free agent on February 11, 2020.

Frisco Fighters
Arceneaux hoped to play one final season in 2020 before retiring, but the COVID-19 pandemic caused the 2020 CFL season to be cancelled.

In April 2021, Arceneaux signed with the Frisco Fighters of the Indoor Football League, after being persuaded by Frisco quarterback Jonathan Bane to join the team. The 33-year old receiver reflected on his "rookie season" in indoor football as potentially his last, which he considers the opposite of many indoor football players' careers, as the sport is more often used by younger players seeking a stepping stone to NFL or CFL play. Arceneaux caught 36 passes for 320 yards and 6 touchdowns, along with scoring 3 rushing touchdowns over 11 regular season games. In the 2 playoff games Frisco played prior to elimination, Arceneaux added 67 more yards on 4 catches, plus two more rushing touchdowns.

Edmonton Elks
On January 26, 2022, it was announced that Arceneaux had signed with the Edmonton Elks.

Career Statistics

References

External links
 
 

1987 births
Living people
Alcorn State Braves football players
American football wide receivers
American players of Canadian football
BC Lions players
Saskatchewan Roughriders players
Edmonton Elks players
Canadian football wide receivers
Minnesota Vikings players
New York Jets players
Peabody Magnet High School alumni
Players of American football from Louisiana
Sportspeople from Alexandria, Louisiana
Washington Redskins players
Players of Canadian football from Louisiana